"Livin' Right" is a song by American musician and singer-songwriter Glenn Frey, a former member of the Eagles. It was released as a single from his third solo studio album Soul Searchin' in 1989. The single features the track "Soul Searchin'" as the B-side, which was also released as a single from the album, before "Livin' Right".

Background
In the liner notes to the original album, Glenn Frey wrote of the song, "My anthem to fitness. Jack [Tempchin] and I both started working out, eating right and generally tightening up our acts. Having tried nearly every other way to feel good, we've wound up back in gym class. Who'd of thunk it!"

Chart performance
Unlike the other singles from the album, it was not as successful as it reached a poor peak position of No. 90 on the Billboard Hot 100, but it charted at No. 22 on the Adult Contemporary chart.

Personnel 
 Glenn Frey – lead and backing vocals, keyboards, guitars, bass, percussion, arrangements
 Hawk Wolinski – keyboards, arrangements
 Russ Kunkel – drums
 Steve Forman – percussion
 The Heart Attack Horns – horns
 Bill Bergman – saxophone solo
 Greg Smith – horn arrangements

References

External links
 

1989 singles
Glenn Frey songs
MCA Records singles
Songs written by Jack Tempchin
Songs written by Glenn Frey
1988 songs